AFC Rhoose are a Welsh football club from Rhoose, a village and community near the sea (the Bristol Channel) in the Vale of Glamorgan, Wales, near Barry. They played for two seasons in the Welsh Football League . They currently play in the Vale of Glamorgan League Premier Division.

Club history
The club was formed in 1969 as Rhoose Social in the Barry and District League. The club, as Rhoose FC, were accepted into the South Wales Amateur League for a second time in 2006–07 and were Division Two champions in the 2007–08 season. In the 2012–13 season they were Division One champions and beat Sully Sports (champions of the South Wales Senior League in the Welsh Football League promotion play-off match.

The club spent the following two seasons in Welsh Football League Division Three, finishing eighth and fifth respectively before they resigned from the league at the end of the season.

The club's current organisation came as an amalgamation of the different football teams playing in Rhoose in 2015. Senior teams Pro Copy FC and Rhoose Rovers merged in addition to the mini and junior teams of Rhoose Athletic to play under one united club as AFC Rhoose.

Honours

A.F.C. Rhoose
Vale of Glamorgan League Premier Division – Runners-Up: 2018–19
Vale of Glamorgan League First Division – Champions: 2019–20 (reserves team)
Vale of Glamorgan League Second Division – Champions: 2018–19 (reserves team)
ASRS Cup – Winners: 2018–19
ASRS Cup – Winners: 2021-22

Rhoose F.C. 
South Wales Amateur League Division One – Champions: 2012–13
South Wales Amateur League Division Two – Champions: 2007–08
Vale of Glamorgan League Premier Division – Champions: 2006–07
South Wales FA Senior Cup – Winners: 2009–10

Rhoose Rovers
Vale of Glamorgan League Second Division – Champions: 2012–13
Dockers Cup – Winners: 2012–13

ProCopy F.C.
Vale of Glamorgan League Division One – Champions: 2012–13
Vale of Glamorgan League Division Two – Champions: 2011–12
Dockers Cup – Winners: 2011–12

Welsh Football League history
Information in this section is sourced from the Football Club History Database.

Notes

References

External links
Club website

Football clubs in Wales
Welsh Football League clubs
South Wales Amateur League clubs
Association football clubs established in 1969
1969 establishments in Wales